Mehmet Altıparmak (born 1 May 1969) is a Turkish professional football manager and former player. As a footballer, Altıparmak played as a midfielder.

Career
Altıparmak was a footballer throughout the pro and semi-pro divisions in Turkey. A journeyman, he began his career with Gençlerbirliği and had stints at Petrolofisi, Denizlispor, Bursaspor, Eskişehirspor, Turanspor, Diyarbakırspor, Elazığspor, Sakaryaspor, Çanakkale Dardanelspor, Yozgatspor, Şanlıurfaspor, and Turanspor.

Managerial career
Altıparmak is a journeyman manager for the Turkish semi-pro and pro leagues. He began as an assistant coach to Ümit Kayıhan at Kocaelispor, who was his former manager Denizlispor. He began managing with Kartalspor in 2007, and since has had stints with Tarsus, 1922 Konyaspor, Altay, Yeni Malatyaspor, Kartalspor, Alanyaspor, Denizlispor, Gümüşhanespor, Elazığspor, BB Erzurumspor, Gaziantep, and Akhisarspor. In 2018, he promoted BB Erzurumspor into the Süper Lig. Again, in 2020, he helped Hatayspor get promoted to the Süper Lig for the first time in their history. He followed that up with contracts at Kasımpaşa, and most recently as of 2021, Gençlerbirliği.

References

External links

TFF Manager Profile

1969 births
Living people
Sportspeople from Ankara
Turkish footballers
Gençlerbirliği S.K. footballers
Denizlispor footballers
Bursaspor footballers
Eskişehirspor footballers
Turanspor footballers
Diyarbakırspor footballers
Elazığspor footballers
Sakaryaspor footballers
Dardanelspor footballers
Şanlıurfaspor footballers
Turkish football managers
Kartalspor managers
Altay S.K. managers
Yeni Malatyaspor managers
Alanyaspor managers
Denizlispor managers
Elazığspor managers
Gaziantep F.K. managers
Akhisarspor managers
Hatayspor managers
Kasımpaşa S.K. managers
Samsunspor managers
Süper Lig players
TFF First League players
TFF Second League players
Süper Lig managers
Association football midfielders
Kocaelispor managers